Museo Colonial (English: Colonial Museum) is a historical, cultural and religious museum located in Santiago, Chile. The museum explores the colonial period of Chile and South America, with a collection of paintings, sculpture, furniture and other objects. Many of the pieces are religious, and were created in Peru, the former colonial capital. The museum also features a genealogical tree of the Franciscan Order which is "gigantic" in size and includes 644 miniature portraits.

The museum is housed in the convent adjacent to San Francisco Church.

References

Museums in Santiago, Chile
History museums in Chile
Religious museums in Chile